The 2015 Britcar 24 Hour Race Silverstone was the 10th running of the Silverstone 24 Hours endurance sports car race held on April 25–26, 2015 at the Silverstone Circuit.

Victory overall and in Class 3 went to the No. 35 Beechdean AMR Aston Martin V8 Vantage driven by Andrew Howard, Jonathan Adam, Harry Whale, Jamie Chadwick, and Ross Gunn. Victory in Class 4 went to the No. 50 St. Bas Koeten Racing SEAT León Cup Racer driven by Karel Gijs Bessem, Harry Hilders, and Roger Grouwels. Class 1 was won by the No. 10 Radical Sportcars Radical RXC V8 driven by Laurence Wiltshire, Shahin Nouri, Martyn Smith, and Richard Roberts. Class 5 was won by the No. 62 Red Camel-jordan.nl SEAT Leon driven by Ivo Breukers, Rik Breukers, and Sjaco Griffioen. Finally, Class 2 went to the No. 91 MARC Cars Australia MARC Focus GTC driven by Tom Onslow-Cole, Paul White, Ben Gersekowski, and Garry Jacobson.

Race results
Class winners in bold.

References

2015 in British motorsport
April 2015 sports events in the United Kingdom